The Lockheed Martin X-44 MANTA (Multi-Axis No-Tail Aircraft) was an American conceptual aircraft design by Lockheed Martin that has been studied by NASA and the U.S. Air Force. It was intended to test the feasibility of full yaw, pitch and roll authority without tailplanes (horizontal or vertical). Attitude control relies purely on 3D thrust vectoring.  The aircraft design was derived from the F-22 Raptor and featured a stretched delta wing without tail surfaces.

Design and development

The X-44 was designed by Lockheed Martin to demonstrate the feasibility of an aircraft controlled by vectored thrust alone. The X-44 design had a reduced radar signature (due to lack of tail and vertical stabilizers) and was made more efficient by eliminating the tail and rudder surfaces, and instead using thrust vectors to provide yaw, pitch and roll control.

The X-44 MANTA design was based on the F-22, except without a tail and incorporating a full delta wing. The X-44 MANTA would have a greater fuel capacity than the F-22, due to its larger delta wing design. The MANTA was designed to have reduced mechanical complexity, increased fuel efficiency and greater agility. The X-44 MANTA combined the control and propulsion systems, using thrust vectoring. Funding for the X-44 program ended in 2000.

See also

References

External links
 Day, Dwayne A. "Delta Wings". centennialofflight.net

Stealth aircraft
X-044
Cancelled military aircraft projects of the United States
Twinjets
Tailless delta-wing aircraft